Vladimír Hrivnák (23 April 1945 – 17 October 2014) was a Slovak football player and later a football manager. He played for Czechoslovakia, for which he played 13 matches. He helped Slovan Bratislava to the 1969 European Cup Winners' Cup Final where he scored one of their goals as they beat Barcelona 3-2.

He was a participant at the 1970 FIFA World Cup.

He played mostly for Slovan Bratislava.

He coached DAC Dunajská Streda, ZŤS Košice, Inter Bratislava, DAC Dunajská Streda, Matador Púchov, ŠKP Bratislava.

References

1945 births
2014 deaths
Slovak footballers
Czechoslovak footballers
ŠK Slovan Bratislava players
Czechoslovakia international footballers
1970 FIFA World Cup players
Czechoslovak football managers
Slovak football managers
FC VSS Košice managers
FK Inter Bratislava managers
FC DAC 1904 Dunajská Streda managers
People from Hnúšťa
Sportspeople from the Banská Bystrica Region
MŠK Púchov managers
Association football defenders